The 1972–73 Tercera División season is the 39th since its establishment.

League tables

Group I

Group II

Group III

Group IV

Promotion playoff

Relegation playoff

Season records
 Most wins: 24, Salamanca.
 Most draws: 16, Pegaso and Xerez.
 Most losses: 25, Llodio and Ejea.
 Most goals for: 82, Salamanca.
 Most goals against: 94, Acero.
 Most points: 59, Salamanca.
 Fewest wins: 4, Ejea.
 Fewest draws: 3, San Sebastián.
 Fewest losses: 3, Salamanca.
 Fewest goals for: 25, Torrejón and Chantrea.
 Fewest goals against: 21, Palencia.
 Fewest points: 17, Ejea.

External links
RSSSF 
Futbolme 

Tercera División seasons
3
Spain